Grant Leury (born 5 November 1967) is an Australian sprint canoeist who competed in the mid-1990s. He finished seventh in the K-2 1000 m event at the 1996 Summer Olympics in Atlanta.

References

1967 births
Australian male canoeists
Canoeists at the 1996 Summer Olympics
Living people
Olympic canoeists of Australia